PC-UX is a discontinued NEC port of UNIX System III for their APC III and PC-9801 personal computer. It had extensive graphics capability. PC-UX and MS-DOS could reside on the same hard drive. It also had file transfer utilities that allowed files between PC-UX and MS-DOS. There was the PC-UX Softcard which allowed extremely high performance, reliability and memory utilization.

In 1985, the suggested retail price for PC-UX on APC III was $700.

NEC's subsequent port of UNIX System V was called PC-UX/V.

See also 
 Xenix for AT etc.

References 

Discontinued operating systems
NEC software
Unix variants
X86 operating systems